Macadam Stories is a 2015 French comedy-drama film written and directed by Samuel Benchetrit, and based on the first volume of Benchetrit's autobiography Les Chroniques de l'Asphalte. The film was selected to be screened in the  Special Screenings section at the 2015 Cannes Film Festival.

Cast 
 Isabelle Huppert as Jeanne Meyer
 Gustave Kervern as Sternkowitz
 Valeria Bruni Tedeschi as The Nurse
 Tassadit Mandi as Madame Hamida  	
 Jules Benchetrit as Charly 	
 Michael Pitt as John McKenzie 
 Mickaël Graehling as Dédé
 Larouci Didi as Mouloud
 Thierry Gimenez as Monsieur Gilosa

Accolades

References

External links 
 

2015 films
2015 comedy-drama films
2010s French-language films
French comedy-drama films
Films based on biographies
2010s English-language films
2010s French films